George Keith, 10th Earl Marischal (1692 or 1693 – 1778) was a Scottish Jacobite army officer and diplomat, who led Jacobite forces in the rising of 1719. He later joined in the Prussian Army and became a close confidant of Frederick the Great, serving as his ambassador to both France and Great Britain. He was the tenth and last Earl Marischal.

Life
Keith was the son of William Keith, 9th Earl Marischal and Mary Drummond, daughter of James Drummond, 4th Earl of Perth. He was probably born at Inverugie Castle, Scotland and inherited his father's title in 1712.

Keith served in Flanders under the Duke of Marlborough from 1708 to 1711, but for considering placing the Old Pretender on the British throne on Queen Anne's death he was deprived of his commission (or resigned). He fought on the Jacobite side during the 1715 Jacobite rising, including at the battle of Sheriffmuir, and was subsequently attainted for treason by the British government, with his estates falling to the crown.

He fled to the continent of Europe and went on to serve the Jacobite court at Avignon and to be its ambassador to Spain. He led the landing in Scotland of a force of Spanish marines and Jacobite exiles in the Jacobite rising of 1719, but fled again to Europe following defeat at the Battle of Glen Shiel. On 29 December 1725 he was made a knight of the Order of the Thistle by the Old Pretender. In March 1740, the Old Pretender appointed Keith to be his Commander-in-Chief in Scotland, although the position was purely titular and had no practical role. He retired from the Spanish court in 1741, finding it impotent to help the Jacobite cause and warning the Old Pretender not to trust the more positive reports from his agent in Paris, Lord Sempill. He became increasingly isolated from the many Jacobite plots of the early 1740s and entered the service of Frederick the Great of Prussia. In August 1751, Frederick appointed Keith as his ambassador to Versailles. Keith had always been distrustful of Charles Edward Stuart, and refused to meet him in Paris during the Prince's secret visits, only engaging with the Prince's agent Henry Goring. Following the Prince's dismissal of Goring in 1751, Keith broke off all communication with the Prince.

He then served Frederick the Great as his ambassador to Spain from 1759 to 1761, informing the British government of Spanish preparations to enter the war on France's side, which gained him his pardon by George II on 29 May 1759. Further actions by the British government returned him his right to use his title and regain his estates in Great Britain. Frederick appointed Keith his ambassador to Great Britain in 1759, but despite brief return trips to Scotland in 1761 and 1763–64, he found the climate and his neighbours unfavourable. At Frederick's invitation, Keith sold the estates and returned to Prussia for good, becoming a close friend of the Prussian king and dying in Potsdam in 1778. Keith was a recipient of the Order of the Black Eagle. He was a friend and patron of Jean-Jacques Rousseau. His brother James Francis Edward Keith also served Prussia as a field marshal.

His portrait is in the collection of the National Portrait Gallery, London.

Arms

References

1692 births
1778 deaths
Ambassadors of Prussia
British Life Guards officers
Earls Marischal
People from the Kingdom of Prussia
People of the Jacobite rising of 1715
People of the Jacobite rising of 1719
Scottish diplomats
Scottish Jacobites